Kate Mines is an American actress and producer best known for the web series Dropping the Soap and her role as Nurse Gloria on Grey's Anatomy.

Filmography

References

External links
 

American actresses
Living people
Year of birth missing (living people)
21st-century American women